Juan Pablo Brzezicki and Juan Pablo Guzmán were the defending champions, but chose not to participate that year.

František Čermák and Rogier Wassen won in the final 7–5, 7–5, against Jesse Huta Galung and Igor Sijsling.

Seeds

Draw

Draw

External links
Draw

Doubles